The Çotanak Sports Complex is a stadium in Giresun, Turkey.  It has a capacity of approximately 21,500 spectators, after initially being planned for 22,028. It is the new home of Giresunspor, currently playing in the Turkish Süper Lig. It has replaced the club's former home, Giresun Atatürk Stadium. Next to the stadium, there is an olympic swimming pool with a capacity of 1,000 spectators and a training ground.

References

Football venues in Turkey
Sports venues completed in 2021
2022 establishments in Turkey